The Oaro River is a river of the north Canterbury region of New Zealand's South Island.

See also
List of rivers of New Zealand

References

Kaikōura District
Rivers of Canterbury, New Zealand
Rivers of New Zealand